The women's 800 metres event at the 2001 European Athletics U23 Championships was held in Amsterdam, Netherlands, at Olympisch Stadion on 14 and 15 July.

Medalists

Results

Final
15 July

Heats
14 July
Qualified: first 3 in each heat and 2 best to the Final

Heat 1

Heat 2

Participation
According to an unofficial count, 16 athletes from 15 countries participated in the event.

 (1)
 (1)
 (1)
 (1)
 (1)
 (1)
 (1)
 (1)
 (1)
 (1)
 (1)
 (2)
 (1)
 (1)
 (1)

References

800 metres
800 metres at the European Athletics U23 Championships